"Kung av sand" is a song written by Per Gessle and recorded by Gyllene Tider, released as a single on 31 July 1995. The single peaked at number 31 on the Swedish singles chart. It also charted at Trackslistan for nine weeks between 26 August and 28 October 1995, and also topped the chart.

Track listing
Kung av sand - 4:40
Du är en gangster, älskling! - 3:30

Charts

Other recordings
In 2005, the song was recorded by Munkarna on the album 1:a kapitlet.

References

External links

1995 singles
Gyllene Tider songs
Songs written by Per Gessle
1995 songs
Parlophone singles